In Greek mythology, Arsinoe, sometimes spelled Arsinoë, (Ancient Greek: Ἀρσινόη), was the name of the following individuals.
 Arsinoe, one of the Nysiads (Dodonides), nurses of the infant Dionysus in Mount Nysa.
 Arsinoe, daughter of Leucippus and possibly Philodice. She was also the sister of Hilaeira and Phoebe, who were abducted by the Dioscuri. By the god Apollo, Arsinoe bore Asclepius, 'leader of men' and Eriopis 'with the lovely hair'. Otherwise, the mother of Asclepius was called Coronis, daughter of Phlegyas because it is said that Asclepius being the son of Arsinoe, was a fiction invented by Hesiod, or by one of Hesiod's interpolators, just to please the Messenians. At Sparta she had a sanctuary and was worshipped as a heroine.
 Arsinoe, one of the Minyades, according to Plutarch. These daughter of Minyas were struck with madness and having conceived a greedy appetite for man's flesh, cast lots accordingly for their children to see who they were going to eat. Whereupon it fell to Leucippe's lot to produce her son Hippasus to be cut in pieces.
 Arsinoe or Alphesiboea, daughter of Phegeus, king of Psophis in Arcadia and sister of Pronous and Agenor. She was the wife of Alcmaeon, leader of the Epigoni by whom she bore a son, Clytius. After Alcmaeon was purified from blood guilt by Phegeus for murdering his own mother Eriphyle, Arsinoe was given in marriage to the hero who received from him the necklace of Harmonia. Later on, her brothers, Pronous and Agenor killed Alcmaeon at the instigation of their father. When Arsinoe condemned them of the act, they clapped her into a chest and carried her to Tegea. There they gave her as a slave to Agapenor, falsely accusing her of her husband's murder. Eventually, retribution came when the sons of Alcmaeon, Amphoterus and Acarnan slew their father's murderers and also Phegeus and his wife.
 Arsinoe, nurse of Orestes who saved him from the hands of his mother Clytemnestra, and carried him to the aged Strophius, the father of Pylades. Other traditions called this nurse Laodameia.
 Arsinoe, daughter of King Nicocreon of Salamis in Cyprus (descendant of Teucer, son of Telamon). She was loved by Arceophon who wooed her, but the maiden's father refused to give his daughter to Arceophon because of the latter's Phoenician descent. Arceophon was upset and began to come to Arsinoe's house by night, hoping to win her heart, but in vain. He then tried to bribe Arsinoe's nurse so that she might arrange for them to meet, but Arsinoe reported this to her parents, who cut off the nurse's tongue, nose and fingers and drove her out of their house. Having lost every hope, Arceophon committed suicide by starving himself to death. The fellow citizens grieved at his death and buried him with honors. When Arsinoe leaned out of the window to take a look at the funeral ceremony, the goddess of love, Aphrodite turned her into stone.

Notes

References 

 Antoninus Liberalis, The Metamorphoses of Antoninus Liberalis translated by Francis Celoria (Routledge 1992). Online version at the Topos Text Project.
 Apollodorus, The Library with an English Translation by Sir James George Frazer, F.B.A., F.R.S. in 2 Volumes, Cambridge, MA, Harvard University Press; London, William Heinemann Ltd. 1921. ISBN 0-674-99135-4. Online version at the Perseus Digital Library. Greek text available from the same website.
Gaius Julius Hyginus, Fabulae from The Myths of Hyginus translated and edited by Mary Grant. University of Kansas Publications in Humanistic Studies. Online version at the Topos Text Project.
 Hesiod, Catalogue of Women from Homeric Hymns, Epic Cycle, Homerica translated by Evelyn-White, H G. Loeb Classical Library Volume 57. London: William Heinemann, 1914. Online version at theio.com
 Lucius Mestrius Plutarchus, Moralia with an English Translation by Frank Cole Babbitt. Cambridge, MA. Harvard University Press. London. William Heinemann Ltd. 1936. Online version at the Perseus Digital Library. Greek text available from the same website.
 Marcus Tullius Cicero, Nature of the Gods from the Treatises of M.T. Cicero translated by Charles Duke Yonge (1812-1891), Bohn edition of 1878. Online version at the Topos Text Project.
 Marcus Tullius Cicero, De Natura Deorum. O. Plasberg. Leipzig. Teubner. 1917.  Latin text available at the Perseus Digital Library.
 Pausanias, Description of Greece with an English Translation by W.H.S. Jones, Litt.D., and H.A. Ormerod, M.A., in 4 Volumes. Cambridge, MA, Harvard University Press; London, William Heinemann Ltd. 1918. Online version at the Perseus Digital Library
 Pausanias, Graeciae Descriptio. 3 vols. Leipzig, Teubner. 1903.  Greek text available at the Perseus Digital Library.
 Pindar, Odes translated by Diane Arnson Svarlien. 1990. Online version at the Perseus Digital Library.
 Pindar, The Odes of Pindar including the Principal Fragments with an Introduction and an English Translation by Sir John Sandys, Litt.D., FBA. Cambridge, MA., Harvard University Press; London, William Heinemann Ltd. 1937. Greek text available at the Perseus Digital Library.

Nymphs
Princesses in Greek mythology
Women of Apollo
Metamorphoses into inanimate objects in Greek mythology
Arcadian characters in Greek mythology
Messenian characters in Greek mythology
Minyan characters in Greek mythology
Asclepius in mythology
Dionysus in mythology